Bar Island is an island in Bar Harbor, Maine, US.

Bar Island may also refer to:

 Bar Island (New Brunswick), two islands in the Bay of Fundy, New Brunswick, Canada
 Bar Island, a moraine in Sandy Point State Reservation, Massachusetts, US
 Bar Island (Antarctica), a small island off the Antarctic Peninsula

See also
 Islet, a very small island made of rock, sand, and/or coral
 Shoal, a natural submerged ridge, bank, or bar that consists of, or is covered by, sand